Tracey Marshall (née Waters; born 28 August 1973) is a former female rugby union player. She represented  and Canterbury. She was a member of the 1998 Women's Rugby World Cup winning squad.

References

External links
Black Ferns Profile

1973 births
Living people
New Zealand women's international rugby union players
New Zealand female rugby union players
Female rugby union players